Re Daniel Dawal Migel 2 is a 2000 Sri Lankan Sinhala comedy, action film directed by Roy de Silva and produced by Soma Edirisinghe for E.A.P Films. It is the second film of Re Daniel Dawal Migel film franchise and sequel to 1998 Re Daniel Dawal Migel 1 film and prequel to 2004 Re Daniel Dawal Migel 3 film. Actors from first film reprises their roles. It stars comic duo Bandu Samarasinghe, and Tennyson Cooray in lead roles along with Ranjan Ramanayake, Sangeetha Weeraratne and Maduranga Chandimal. Music for the film is done by Somapala Rathnayake. The film also became one of Sri Lanka's blockbuster hit with reaching more than 100 days in cinema theaters. It is the 932rd Sri Lankan film in the Sinhala cinema.

Plot
At the end of first film, Daniyel (Bandu) and Migel (Tennyson) was jailed for more than 1700 years. But they well enjoyed in their life in prison by dancing and singing songs with other prisoners. The two was released after two years in jail by president's excuse. Just after come out of the jail, the two are attacked by the tailor, who gave their suits prior to arrest. They ran naked after giving their suits and met by a newly wedded couple. They moved to a hotel and act like two Indian superstars and soon they were arrested by the police due to these nuisance for the public. At the police, the two see Chandi ayya and asked what happened to him and Madhuri after their imprisonment. Chandi ayya told the story that he went to commit suicide and rescued by Lathara's daughter Wasana (Vasana). Madhuri went to see his mother-in-law with Sanjaya and not much known about her. The three released by the police and they started to find Madhuri. Chandi ayya welcomes his two friends to Uncle Lathara's house. Lathara (Gemunu) is a musician who always plays harmonium. Meanwhile, Madhuri was caught by Richard, who is drug dealer and detective cobra's allie (Lietch) investigate about her and tells the story to Chandi ayya and duo. The three went to see Madhuri and a fight taken place. Madhuri has been rescued and bring back to Sanjaya and explained about the past. The two united again and married finally.

Cast
 Bandu Samarasinghe as Ra Daniyel 
 Tennyson Cooray as Dawal Migel
 Ranjan Ramanayake as Chandi Ayya
 Sangeetha Weeraratne as Madhuri
 Maduranga Chandimal as Sanjaya
 Roy de Silva as C.I.D Cobra
 Ronnie Leitch as Cobra helper
 Sumana Amarasinghe as Mrs. Kulawansha
 Vasana Danthanarayana as Wasana, Chandi Ayya love interest
 Gemunu Wijesuriya as Lathara, Wasana's father
 Lal Kumara as Richard

Soundtrack

Sequel
The third and final installment of the franchise Re Daniel Dawal Migel 3 was released on 2004.

References

2000 films
2000s Sinhala-language films
Films set in Sri Lanka (1948–present)